The 2020–21 UCLA Bruins women's basketball team represented the University of California, Los Angeles during the 2020–21 NCAA Division I women's basketball season. The Bruins, led by tenth year head coach Cori Close, played their home games at Pauley Pavilion and competed as members of the Pac-12 Conference.

Previous season 
The Bruins finished the season 26–5, 14–4 in Pac-12 play to finish in a tie for second place. As the second seed in the Pac-12 women's tournament they advanced to the semifinals where they lost to Stanford.  The NCAA tournament and WNIT were cancelled due to the COVID-19 outbreak.

Offseason

Departures

2020 recruiting class

Roster

 Kayla Owens and Kiara Jefferson declined to participate in the 2020-21 season due to the COVID-19 pandemic. 
 Brynn Masikewich chose to remain home in Canada for the 2020-21 season to rehab from an injury. 
 Izzy Anstey and Gemma Potter, both from Australia, were not allowed to enter the United States for the 2020-21 academic year due to immigration restrictions related to the COVID-19 pandemic. Potter later elected to play professionally in Australia. 
 December 28, 2020: Class of 2021 high school recruit Dominque Darius graduated early so she could enroll at UCLA and participate in the 2020-21 season.

Schedule
Source:

|-
!colspan=6 style=| Regular season

|-
!colspan=6 style=| Pac-12 Women's Tournament

|-
!colspan=6 style=|NCAA tournament

Rankings

See also
2020–21 UCLA Bruins men's basketball team

References

UCLA
UCLA Bruins women's basketball
UCLA Bruins basketball, women
UCLA Bruins basketball, women
UCLA Bruins basketball, women
UCLA Bruins basketball, women
UCLA